Bob McLean may refer to:

 Bob McLean (Australian footballer) (1914–1989), member of the Australian Football Hall of Fame
 Bob McLean (racing driver) (1933–1966), Canadian racing driver
 Bob McLean (rugby union) (born 1949), rugby union player who represented Australia
 Bob McLean (Scottish footballer) (1902–1970), Scottish footballer (Alloa Athletic, Doncaster Rovers)
 Bob McLean (winemaker) (1947–2015), Australian winemaker

See also
 Robert McLean (disambiguation)
 Robert MacLean (disambiguation)